Mark Antony MacDonnell (1854 – 9 July 1906) was an Irish nationalist politician and Member of Parliament (MP) in the House of Commons of the United Kingdom of Great Britain and Ireland.

He was elected as the Irish National Federation (Anti-Parnellite) MP for the Queen's County Leix constituency at the 1892 general election, and was re-elected unopposed at the 1895 general election. He was elected as the Irish Parliamentary Party MP at the 1900 general election. He did not contest the 1906 general election.

External links

1854 births
1906 deaths
Irish Parliamentary Party MPs
Members of the Parliament of the United Kingdom for Queen's County constituencies (1801–1922)
UK MPs 1892–1895
UK MPs 1895–1900
UK MPs 1900–1906
People from County Laois
Anti-Parnellite MPs